Tintioule is a town in the Kankan Region of Guinea.

Populated places in the Kankan Region